Riegelsville is an unincorporated community located in Pohatcong Township in Warren County, New Jersey. It is connected to Riegelsville, Pennsylvania across the Delaware River by the Riegelsville Bridge at the confluence of the Musconetcong River with the Delaware River. 

The Riegelsville Company Town Historic District encompassing the community was listed in the New Jersey Register of Historic Places in 1998.

Transportation
NJ County Route 627, also known as Riegelsville Milford Road and Riegelsville Warren Glen Road, runs north-south through the community.

See also
 National Register of Historic Places listings in Warren County, New Jersey
 George Hunt House

References

External links
 
 

Pohatcong Township, New Jersey
Unincorporated communities in New Jersey
Unincorporated communities in Warren County, New Jersey